The autoimmune regulator (AIRE) is a protein that in humans is encoded by the AIRE gene. It is a 13kb gene on chromosome 21q22.3 that has 545 amino acids. AIRE is a transcription factor expressed in the medulla (inner part) of the thymus. It is part of the mechanism which eliminates self-reactive T cells that would cause autoimmune disease. It exposes T cells to normal, healthy proteins from all parts of the body, and T cells that react to those proteins are destroyed.

Each T cell recognizes a specific antigen when it is presented in complex with a major histocompatibility complex (MHC) molecule by an antigen presenting cell.  This recognition is accomplished by the T cell receptors expressed on the cell surface. T cells receptors are generated by randomly shuffled gene segments which results in a highly diverse population of T cells  - each with a unique antigen specificity. Subsequently, T cells with receptors that recognize the body's own proteins need to be eliminated while still in the thymus. Through the action of AIRE, medullary thymic epithelial cells (mTEC) express major proteins from elsewhere in the body (so called "tissue-restricted antigens" - TRA) and T cells that respond to those proteins are eliminated through cell death (apoptosis). Thus AIRE drives negative selection of self-recognizing T cells. When AIRE is defective, T cells that recognize antigens normally produced by the body can exit the thymus and enter circulation. This can result in a variety of autoimmune diseases.

The gene was first reported by two independent research groups Aaltonen et al. and Nagamine et al. in 1997 who were able to isolate and clone the gene from human chromosome 21q22.3. Their work was able to show that mutations in the AIRE gene are responsible for the pathogenesis of Autoimmune polyglandular syndrome type I. More insight into the Aire protein was later provided by Heino et al. in 2000. They showed that Aire protein is mainly expressed in the thymic medullary epithelial cells using immunohistochemistry.

Function 
In the thymus, the AIRE causes transcription of a wide selection of organ-specific genes that create proteins that are usually only expressed in peripheral tissues, creating an "immunological self-shadow" in the thymus. It is important that self-reactive T cells that bind strongly to self-antigen are eliminated in the thymus (via the process of negative selection), otherwise they may later encounter and bind to their corresponding self-antigens and initiate an autoimmune reaction. So the expression of non-local proteins by AIRE in the thymus reduces the threat of autoimmunity by promoting the elimination of auto-reactive T cells that bind antigens not normally found in the thymus. Furthermore, it has been found that AIRE is expressed in a population of stromal cells located in secondary lymphoid tissues, however these cells appear to express a distinct set of TRAs compared to mTECs.

Research in knockout mice has demonstrated that AIRE functions through initiating the transcription of a diverse set of self-antigens, such as insulin, in the thymus. This expression then allows maturing thymocytes to become tolerant towards peripheral organs, thereby suppressing autoimmune disease.

The AIRE gene is expressed in many other tissues as well. AIRE gene is also expressed in the 33D1+ subset of dendritic cells in mouse and in human dendritic cells.

Structure 
AIRE is composed of a multidomain structure that is able to bind to chromatin and act as a regulator of gene transcription. The specific makeup of AIRE includes a caspase activation and recruitment domain (CARD), nuclear localization signal (NLS), SAND domain, and two plant-homeodomain (PHD) fingers. The SAND domain is located in the middle of the amino-acid chain (aa 180-280) and mediates the binding of AIRE to phosphate groups of DNA. Another potential role for this domain is to anchor AIRE to heterologous proteins. The two cysteine-rich PHD finger domains at the C-terminus of AIRE are PHD1 (aa 299-340) and PHD2 (aa 434-475) which are separated by a proline-rich region of amino acids. These finger domains serve to read chromatin marks through the degree of methylation at the tail of histone H3. More specifically, PHD1 is able to recognize unmethylation at the H3 tail as an epigenetic mark.

An integral characteristic of AIRE is its ability to homomerize into dimers and trimers which allows it to bind to specific oligonucleotide motifs. This property comes from the homogeneously staining region (HSR) located at the N-terminus. Because of the α-helical four-helix bundle structure, HSR’s are sensitive to conformational changes of the gene. Variants and deletions involving this domain cause an inability to activate gene transcription by preventing oligomer formation and can result in APS-1.

Mechanism 
Instead of binding to consensus sequences of target gene promoters, like conventional transcription factors, AIRE engages in coordinated sequences that are performed by its multimolecular complexes. The first AIRE partner that was identified is the CREB-binding protein (CBP) that is localized in nuclear bodies and is a co-activator of many transcription factors. Other AIRE partners include positive transcription elongation factor b (P-TEFb) and DNA activated protein kinase (DNA-PK). DNA-PK phosphorylates AIRE in vitro at Thr68 and Ser156. Another partner is DNA-topoisomerase (DNA-TOP) IIα. This isomerase enzyme works on DNA topology and removes positive and negative DNA supercoils by causing transient DNA breaks. In turn, this causes relaxation of local chromatin and helps the initiation and post-initiation events of gene transcription. By performing double-stranded DNA breaks, DNA-TOPIIα recruits DNA-PK and poly-(ADP-ribose) polymerase (PARP1) which are involved in DNA break and repair through non-homologous end joining.

Pathology
The AIRE gene is mutated in the rare autoimmune syndrome autoimmune polyendocrinopathy syndrome type 1 (APS-1), also known as autoimmune polyendocrinopathy-candidiasis-ectodermal dystrophy (APECED). Different mutations are more common among certain populations in the world. The most common mutations of AIRE occur on exons 1, 2, 6, 8, and 10. Exons 1 and 2 encode the HSR, exon 6 encodes the SAND domain, exon 8 is in the PHD-1 domain, and exon 10 is located in the proline-rich region between the two PHD finger domains. Known mutations in AIRE include Arg139X, Arg257X, and Leu323SerfsX51.

Disruption of AIRE results in the development of a range of autoimmune diseases, the most common clinical conditions in the syndrome are hypoparathyroidism, primary adrenocortical failure and chronic mucocutaneous candidiasis.

A gene knockout of the murine homolog of Aire has created a transgenic mouse model that is used to study the mechanism of disease in human patients.

Interactions 

Autoimmune regulator has been shown to interact with CREB binding protein.

See also 
 List of human clusters of differentiation for a list of CD molecules
 Immune system
 Immune tolerance

References

Further reading

External links 
 
 
 

Immune system
Immunology
Transcription factors